Son of the Renegade is a 1953 low-budget American Western film directed by Reg Browne. The film's soundtrack was conducted by Darrell Calker. The film also features an uncredited co-screenwriting role for Legendary B-Movie director Ed Wood

Plot summary 
Red River Johnny gathers his friends (most of whom are called some variation of the name Bill) and returns to claim the heritage of his father who was outlawed many years ago by the sheriff of Red River. The present Sheriff Masters, son of the man Johnny's father shot, is his enemy. Three-Finger Jack stages a series of robberies and stage coach holdups, for which he frames Red River Johnny. The latter learns that Three-Finger plans to rob the town bank, and gathers his men and wipes out Three-Finger and his gang.

Cast

External links 

1953 films
American black-and-white films
1953 Western (genre) films
American Western (genre) films
1950s English-language films
1950s American films